Magdalena Daria Gessler (née Ikonowicz, also known as Magda Gessler; born July 10, 1953) is a Polish television personality, celebrity chef, restaurateur and painter. Gessler is known for presenting TV programme Kuchenne rewolucje (Polish version of Kitchen Nightmares) and judging in Polish version of MasterChef.

Biography 
Born in Poland to an Italian-Polish father Mirosław Ikonowicz and a Russian mother Olga Borkowska,  Magda Gessler grew up in Sofia, Bulgaria and in Havana, Cuba. Her father was a journalist and mother was a chef. In 1972 Gessler settled in Madrid, where she graduated from the Royal Academy of Fine Arts.

She published three cookbooks: Kuchnia moja pasja (2005), Kocham gotować – Magdy Gessler przepis na życie (2007) and Kuchenne Rewolucje. Przepisy Magdy Gessler (2012). She has also published articles in the Wprost and Newsweek magazines. Since 2010, she has been presenting the Kuchenne rewolucje programme, which has brought her great popularity in Poland. Since 2012, she has served as a judge on the Polish edition of MasterChef talent show. In 2016 and 2019, she made guest appearances on the MasterChef Junior Polska show. In 2019, she was a host of the Odkrycia Magdy Gessler programme aired on Food Network TV channel. She appeared on popular TV shows such as Niania (2008) and Na Wspólnej (2014), the Polish trailer of Netflix comedy-drama Orange Is the New Black (2018) as well as Big Brother (2019). She also appeared in a reality TV show Starsza Pani musi fiknąć in 2019.

In 2021, she published her autobiography entitled Magda.

Her restaurants include: Zielnik Cafe, U Fukiera, Słodki... Słony, Ale Gloria, Venezia, Jadka (all in Warsaw), Polka in Żelazowa Wola, Kryształowa in Katowice and Santo Porto in Gdynia.

Personal life
Her godfather was writer and journalist Ryszard Kapuściński. Her brother, Piotr Ikonowicz, is a left-wing politician, journalist and activist. In the 1980s, she married German journalist Volkhart Müller. After his death Magda Gessler returned to Poland and married Polish restaurateur Piotr Gessler. Her current partner is a Polish-Canadian doctor, Waldemar Kozerawski. Gessler has two children: Tadeusz and Lara. 

She has declared her religion to be Eastern Orthodox. She resides in Łomianki near Warsaw. She is fluent in Spanish, German and Italian and also has a good command of English and Portuguese.

See also
List of Poles
Polish cuisine

References 

1953 births
Living people
Polish chefs
Polish painters
Eastern Orthodox Christians from Poland
Polish people of Italian descent
Polish people of Russian descent
Polish television personalities
Women chefs
Polish television chefs